Christopher John Robinson  (born 20 April 1936) is an English conductor and organist.

After being organ scholar at Christ Church, Oxford, in 1963 he became Organist and Master of the Choristers at Worcester Cathedral. He was conductor of the City of Birmingham Choir between 1964 and 2002. In 1974, he became Organist and Choirmaster at St George's Chapel, Windsor Castle, a position he held until 1991.

He conducted the Oxford Bach Choir from 1976 to 1997. He became Organist and Director of Music at St John's College, Cambridge in 1992, leading the choir there until his retirement in 2003.

From 2015 to 2018, he was Mentor to the Organ Scholars at Downing College, Cambridge.

References

External links
 Biography of Christopher Robinson

British classical organists
British male organists
English conductors (music)
British male conductors (music)
Commanders of the Order of the British Empire
Commanders of the Royal Victorian Order
Living people
1936 births
21st-century British conductors (music)
21st-century organists
21st-century British male musicians
Male classical organists